Judy Traub (born June 2, 1940) is an American politician and community volunteer.

Traub was born in Boston, Massachusetts and graduated from Brandeis University. She lived in Minnetonka, Minnesota, with her husband Fred and their children, and was a community volunteer. Traub served in the Minnesota Senate in 1991 and 1992 and was a Democrat. Traub then moved to Wellington, Florida, with her husband, and continued to be a community volunteer.

References

1940 births
Living people
Politicians from Boston
People from Minnetonka, Minnesota
People from Wellington, Florida
Brandeis University alumni
Women state legislators in Minnesota
Democratic Party Minnesota state senators